Eupithecia rhodopyra is a moth of the family Geometridae. It was first described by Edward Meyrick in 1899. It is endemic to the Hawaiian island of Kauai.

The dull reddish coloration and the form and angulation of the medial bands of both pairs of wings are characteristic and unlike any other species in Hawaii.

References

External links

rhodopyra
Endemic moths of Hawaii
Moths described in 1899